Américo Rubén "El Tolo" Gallego (born 25 April 1955) is an Argentine football coach and former player. As a midfielder, he played 73 times for the Argentina national team during his playing career.

Playing career
As a player, Gallego debuted in the Argentine league in 1974 as a midfielder for Newell's Old Boys. After a rookie season in which he saw little action, he quickly made a name for himself and was given a starting spot and regular playing time during the 1975 season. Gallego played for Argentina at the 1975 Pan American Games. After being part of the Argentina national team that won the 1978 FIFA World Cup, Gallego stayed on at Newell's for three more years before being transferred to one of the two biggest teams in his country: River Plate.

Gallego played at River until the end of his career. He played for the "Millonarios" for seven years before retiring at the conclusion of the 1987/88 season. He is hailed as a legend at River, as he was the captain during the team's achieving their first Copa Libertadores, Intercontinental Cup and Copa Interamericana's in their rich history.

Nicknamed "El Tolo," Gallego's career ended with a total of 440 Argentine league appearances and 35 goals in a span of 14 years.

Coaching career
After retirement, Gallego turned his attention towards coaching. In 1994 Gallego was chosen to manage his former team, River Plate. In his first tournament as head coach, his Millonarios went undefeated to win the championship.

From 1995, he served as an assistant coach under Daniel Passarella, the Argentine national team's head coach, for the three-year tenure. After his experience with the national team, El Tolo returned to coach River Plate, with whom he won another championship, this time in 2000.

In 2002, he coached Independiente to a championship, ending the team's 8-year drought. In 2004, he returned to the Newell's Old Boys organization after a 23-year hiatus, and once again proved his worth as a head coach, winning a championship that very same year. With that, he became only the second coach ever to win the Argentine Primera championship with three different Argentine clubs (along with José Yudica, who did the same with Argentinos Juniors, Quilmes and Newell's).

His success attracted attention from teams in other countries, notably from Mexico. After leaving Newell's Old Boys, Gallego was sought after by a myriad of clubs, including San Lorenzo de Almagro, but chose CD Toluca in Mexico. Despite being overtly criticized by the media and his team's own fans for his defensive style and benching of established players in favor of younger, inexperienced players – his scheme paid off and Toluca won the Apertura 2005 championship in Mexico, and was named Best Coach of the championship. In 2007 Gallego resigned as coach for Toluca and said he wanted some time off to be with his family and be away from soccer for a while. His time off did not last long, as a juicy offer from Tigres UANL made him change his mind and take over for Mario Carrillo as coach. After an unsuccessful spell and a streak of bad results he was sacked in February 2008.

In March 2009 he returned to Independiente to take over from Miguel Santoro, and signed until June 2010, but did not end up winning any championships nor renewing his contract.

In February 2011 he began a new tenure in Colo-Colo of Chile, which finished on August of that same year.

Career statistics

Player

International career

Manager

Honours

Player
River Plate
Argentine Primera División (2): Nacional 1981, 1985–86
Copa Libertadores (1): 1986
Copa Interamericana (1): 1986
Intercontinental Cup (1): 1986
Argentina
FIFA World Cup (1): 1978

Manager
River Plate
Argentine Primera División (2): Apertura 1994, Clausura 2000
Independiente
Argentine Primera División (1): Apertura 2002
Newell's Old Boys
Argentine Primera División (1): Apertura 2004
Toluca
Mexican Primera División (1): Apertura 2005
Campeón de Campeones (1): 2006

References

External links

 
 
 
 
 
 
 
 
 
 Estadisticas de Futbolistas Argentinos de Todos los Tiempos 

1955 births
Living people
Argentine footballers
Argentina international footballers
1978 FIFA World Cup players
1982 FIFA World Cup players
1975 Copa América players
Copa Libertadores-winning players
FIFA World Cup-winning players
Argentine Primera División players
Newell's Old Boys footballers
Club Atlético River Plate footballers
Argentine football managers
Club Atlético River Plate managers
Club Atlético Independiente managers
Newell's Old Boys managers
Deportivo Toluca F.C. managers
Tigres UANL managers
Colo-Colo managers
Panama national football team managers
Expatriate football managers in Chile
Expatriate football managers in Mexico
Argentine expatriate sportspeople in Chile
Argentine expatriate sportspeople in Mexico
Association football midfielders
Pan American Games bronze medalists for Argentina
Pan American Games medalists in football
Footballers at the 1975 Pan American Games
Medalists at the 1975 Pan American Games
Sportspeople from Córdoba Province, Argentina